The Redwood City Daily News was a free daily newspaper in Redwood City, California published 6 days a week with an average daily circulation of 8,000. The newspaper was founded August 9, 2000 by Dave Price and Jim Pavelich, who also published the Palo Alto Daily News. The Redwood City Daily News was adjudicated as a newspaper of general circulation by the San Mateo County Superior Court in 2001, enabling it to publish legal notices. Both the Palo Alto and Redwood City Daily News editions were distributed in large red newspaper racks and in stores, coffee shops, restaurants, schools and major workplaces. The Redwood City Daily News, along with five other Daily News editions, was sold to Knight Ridder on Feb. 15, 2005. After McClatchy's acquisition of Knight Ridder in early 2006, all six Daily News editions, including the Redwood City Daily News, were bundled with the San Jose Mercury News and sold to MediaNews Group of Denver, Colorado.

On November 12, 2004, the Redwood City Daily News became one of the first print media outlets in the United States to report late-breaking news of national interest. The trial of Scott Peterson for the murder of his wife Laci and their unborn son had taken place at the Redwood City courthouse, and less than an hour after the jury read their verdict the Daily News began circulation of an "extra" edition which announced the result.

The surviving Daily News papers merged on April 7, 2009.

References

External links
 Redwood City Daily News Official Website
 Knight Ridder buys Daily News
 Daily News publishers ride into sunset

MediaNews Group publications
Daily newspapers published in the San Francisco Bay Area
Free daily newspapers
Redwood City, California